Trialism in philosophy was introduced by John Cottingham as an alternative interpretation of the mind–body dualism of Descartes. Trialism keeps the two substances of mind and body, but introduces a third substance, sensation, belonging to the union of mind and body.  This allows animals, which do not think like humans, to be regarded as having sensations and not as being mere automata.

Background 
Cottingham introduced trialism after citing that Descartes' account of sensation and imagination has opened his official dualism under considerable pressure. He cited that an evaluation of the Cartesian writings on human psychology there is a grouping of not two but three notions - mind, body, sensation, hence the term trialism. According to Cottingham, Descartes added the third category or notion "alongside thought and extension without proceeding to reify it as a separate substance". Thinkers such as Daniel Garber and Tad Schmaltz supported this by citing a letter in the correspondence between Descartes and Princess Elizabeth of Bohemia, which indicated that he changed his mind from a dualistic view.

Christian trialism 
Christian trialism is the doctrine that humans have three separate essences (body, soul, spirit), based on a literal interpretation of 1 Thessalonians 5:23 And the very God of peace sanctify you wholly; and I pray God your whole spirit and soul and body be preserved blameless unto the coming of our Lord Jesus Christ. This doctrine holds the soul to belong to the union of the body and the spirit, which makes it roughly compatible with philosophical trialism.  However, the evangelist Kenneth Copeland was criticized by critics such as Hank Hanegraff for extending trialism to each Person in the Trinity, for a total of nine essences.

References

Sources
 Cottingham, J. Cartesian Trialism, Mind, 1985.
 Njikeh, K.D. Derician Trialism: The Concept of Human Composition into the Mind, Submind and Body Substances/Components, International Journal of Philosophy, 2019.

Christian philosophy
Dualism (philosophy of mind)
Theory of mind